The Snake–Columbia shrub steppe is an ecoregion defined by the World Wide Fund for Nature (WWF). This ecoregion receives little precipitation because it is within the rain shadow of the Cascade Range. It takes in a western portion of the Columbia Basin in Washington, and extends south along the Deschutes River Basin, expanding to cover most of southeast Oregon including the Oregon Lakes region. This ecoregion reaches south from Oregon into northern Nevada and the northeast corner of California. It also connects east onto the Snake River Plain, which it follows east from Hells Canyon to the continental divide in eastern Idaho.

Information about this ecoregion is covered by two articles that follow the ecoregion definitions of the United States Environmental Protection Agency:
 Columbia Plateau (ecoregion)
 Snake River Plain (ecoregion)

See also
List of ecoregions in the United States (WWF)

References

Ecoregions of the United States
Deserts and xeric shrublands
Nearctic ecoregions
Ecoregions of Oregon